SMS Hertha was a protected cruiser of the , built for the German Imperial Navy (Kaiserliche Marine) in the 1890s. Hertha was laid down at the AG Vulcan shipyard in 1895, launched in April 1897, and commissioned into the Navy in July 1898.

Hertha served abroad in the German East Asia Squadron for the first six years of her career; she served briefly as the Squadron flagship in 1900. She contributed a landing party to the force that captured the Taku Forts during the Boxer Uprising in 1900. After returning to Germany in 1905, she was modernized and used as a training ship in 1908, following the completion of the refit. She conducted a series of training cruises, and several notable officers served aboard the ship as cadets, including Karl Dönitz and Ernst Lindemann. At the outbreak of World War I, Hertha was mobilized into V Scouting Group, but served in front-line duty only briefly. She was used as a barracks ship after 1915, and ultimately sold for scrapping in 1920.

Design

In the early 1890s, elements in the German naval command structure grappled with what type of cruiser ought to be built to fulfill the various needs of the fleet. In the event, the RMA carried the day and three 6,000-ton cruisers were authorized in 1895. They resembled the larger s, designed at the same time, albeit at reduced scale.

Her propulsion system consisted of three vertical 4-cylinder triple-expansion steam engines, each driving a single screw propeller, with steam provided by twelve coal-fired Belleville boilers. She had a crew of 31 officers and 446 enlisted men.

The ship was armed with a main battery of two  SK L/40 guns in single gun turrets, one forward and one aft. The guns were supplied with 58 rounds of ammunition each. Hertha also carried a secondary battery of eight  SK L/40 guns. Four were mounted in turrets amidships and the other four were placed in casemates, two abreast the conning tower and the others abreast the mainmast. She also carried ten  SK L/35 guns for defense against torpedo boats. The gun armament was rounded out by ten  Maxim machine cannon. She was also equipped with three  torpedo tubes with eight torpedoes, two launchers were mounted on the broadside and the third was in the bow, all below the waterline.

Her main and secondary battery turrets had 10 cm thick sides and the secondary casemates had the same level of protection. The conning tower had 15 cm thick sides.

Service history

Construction and initial service

Hertha, named after the earlier screw frigate , was ordered under the contract name "K" and was laid down at the AG Vulcan shipyard in Stettin in October 1895. She was launched on 14 April 1897, and Ludwig, the son of Luitpold, Prince Regent of Bavaria, christened the ship at the launching ceremony. Named for the earlier steam frigate , the ship was commissioned into the German navy on 23 July 1898 to begin sea trials. (Corvette Captain) Guido von Usedom was the ship's first commander. During her trials, her measured mile tests were filmed with Oskar Messter's black-and-white kinetoscope. The ship's initial testing revealed problems with her boilers, but she nevertheless was sent with the aviso  to escort Kaiser Wilhelm II aboard his yacht Hohenzollern on a voyage to the Mediterranean Sea.

Hertha got underway from Kiel on 18 September, stopped in Gibraltar, and arrived in Venice, Italy, on 4 October, where she met Hohenzollern and Hela. The ships then visited a number of ports in the region, including Constantinople, Jaffa, Haifa, Beirut, and Port Said in the Ottoman Empire. While in Beirut on 11 November, the unit was disbanded and Hertha was assigned to relieve the old ironclad  in the International Squadron that had been assembled in response to the Cretan Revolt. But Herthas boilers had suffered serious damage during the voyage, owing to design defects, and she was instead forced to go to Genoa, Italy, on 14 November at low speed for repairs. While entering the port on the night of 26–27 November, Hertha was struck by a merchant vessel that was torn from its moorings by a strong gale. The ship damaged Herthas upper deck and tore off a boat davit. She then entered the Gio. Ansaldo & C. shipyard for repairs; while the work was ongoing, Hertha received orders to sail for the East Asia Squadron once she was ready for service again.

East Asia Squadron

After completing repairs, Hertha briefly conducted trials to ensure that her propulsion system was in working order before departing for East Asia on 11 April 1899. She stopped in Singapore on 21 May and arrived at Tsingtao in the Kiautschou Bay concession, Germany's colonial possession in China, on 8 June. Her arrival allowed the old ironclad  to return to Germany. At the same time,  (KAdm—Rear Admiral) Ernst Fritze, the deputy commander of the East Asia Squadron, temporarily made Hertha his flagship. The vessel then began a tour of the northern part of the station, sometimes cruising with other vessels of the squadron, before turning south, arriving in Amoy, China, on 2 November. There, she met her sister ship , which Fritze made his new flagship. From there, Hertha cruised to Hong Kong in company with the squadron flagship, the old ironclad . While there, Hertha went into dry dock for maintenance that lasted three months while Deutschland left for home; the squadron commander,  (Vice Admiral) Felix von Bendemann, transferred his flag to Hertha on 17 February 1900.

In early April, Hertha began a tour of Japan, where she was visited by Emperor Meiji. The five cruisers rendezvoused in Tsingtao on 23 April for squadron training exercises that lasted into early May. The ships then dispersed for cruises through the region; Hertha and Gefion steamed up the Yangtze river as far as Hankou in mid-May. Later that month, the ships all returned to Tsingtao. Hertha was scheduled to steam to Tientsin to take Bendemann and the German Minister to China, Clemens von Ketteler, to visit the Qing imperial court, but on 29 May, early reports of the Boxer Uprising had reached the Germans, leading them to cancel the visit.

Boxer Uprising
The Europeans in the region were not initially concerned with the unrest, but as the situation worsened, the British Vice Admiral Edward Seymour, the longest-serving vice admiral in the area, contacted the other European naval commanders and requested a meeting to discuss what measures should be taken. Bendemann ordered his squadron, less Irene, which was to remain behind to guard Tsingtao, to meet the ships of the British China Station off Taku at the mouth of the Hai River. Hertha and the rest of the squadron arrived off Taku on 8 June, and Bendemann met with Seymour the next day. The two admirals did not initially agree on a course of action, owing to the lack of information about the general situation, since the telegraph line to the embassies in Peking had been cut. Bendemann nevertheless sent a landing party of one hundred men drawn from all four of his cruisers ashore to reinforce the men in Tientsin that had been gathered from the Eight Nation Alliance, which had formed to combat the Boxers.

Shortly after midnight on 10 June, Seymour informed Bendemann of a telegram he had received informing him of the critical situation at the Legation Quarter in Peking. Seymour decided to lead a relief force from the European ships' crews, which would march from Tientsin to Peking to relieve the garrison there. Bendemann contributed a force of 20 officers, 2 doctors, and 487 sailors to the Seymour Expedition, about a quarter of the international force, which also included men from French, Russian, Italian, Austro-Hungarian, Japanese, and United States' warships. Herthas contribution consisted of 4 officers and 120 sailors, led by Usedom; while the captain was ashore, the ship was commanded by the executive officer,  (KL—Captain Lieutenant) Hecht. The expedition failed after encountering strong Chinese resistance from both Boxers and government soldiers. In the meantime, concerned about the situation of the expedition and having received word of Chinese reinforcements to the nearby Taku Forts, Bendemann urged action, which resulted in the Battle of the Taku Forts on 17 June. At the same time, the men who had initially gone ashore to defend Tientsin on 9 June came under repeated Chinese attacks, and further men were sent ashore; Hertha contributed another sixty men and four non-commissioned officers, led by KL Adolf von Trotha. The battered force under Seymour's command arrived back in Tientsin on 23 June and further strengthened the forces occupying the city. Fighting continued through mid-July, but by the 18th, most of the men were returned to their ships. 

Following the failure of Seymour's expedition, the Eight Nation Alliance gathered forces from British India, French Indochina, the Philippines, eastern Russia, and Japan to make another attempt to march on Peking by mid-August. Hertha and Hansa contributed 150 and 200 men, respectively, to the force, which arrived in Peking on 18 August, having met light Chinese resistance on the way. In the meantime, the new armored cruiser  had arrived off China and on 17 August, Bendemann transferred his flag to the ship. By 5 September, reinforcements sent from Germany had arrived, allowing the landing parties from Hertha and the other vessels to be withdrawn to their ships by 15 September. Because of his experience during the campaign, Usedom was assigned to Waldersee's staff, leaving Hertha again under the command of Hecht. On 1 October, Hertha took part in the occupation of coastal fortifications at Shanhaiguan. That month,  (FK—Frigate Captain) Carl Derzewski arrived to take command of the ship. She otherwise saw little activity, spending most of her time at Tsingtao and Chefoo. In the course of fighting during the Boxer Uprising, Hertha had suffered seven men killed.

Subsequent operations
Hertha cruised off the Chinese coast through 1901. On 8 June, she once again embarked Waldersee for a visit to Kobe, Japan, that lasted until 19 June and included a meeting with Meiji. Hertha then sailed to Nagasaki, Japan, where Waldersee transferred to the hospital ship Gera, which carried him back to Germany. Hertha then returned to Tsingtao, where she remained for some time before making another visit to Japan. On 21 October, Fürst Bismarck went into dry dock in Hong Kong for periodic maintenance and Bendemann temporarily returned to Hertha. The cruiser then embarked on a tour of the Dutch East Indies that lasted into 1902; she stopped in Singapore on 19 February, where VAdm Richard Geissler came aboard to replace Bendemann as the squadron commander. By that time, work on Fürst Bismarck had been completed, and she arrived in Singapore at the same time to take aboard the new commander. Hertha then steamed north to Uraga, Japan, where she was dry docked for repairs that lasted from 25 March to 5 May. After the ship reached Japan,  (KzS–Captain at Sea) Friedrich von Ingenohl arrived to take command.

After completing repairs in Nagasaki, Hertha returned to Tsingtao, where she remained before again visiting Japanese cities. While steaming off Formosa on 9 August, she was struck by a typhoon that caused significant flooding. KzS Malte von Schimmelmann relieved Ingenohl in November. Later that year, she visited ports in the Philippines, the Dutch East Indies, and Singapore. In early 1903, she returned to Nagasaki for another overhaul. Hertha then steamed back to Tsingtao, where she lay for four months, before visiting ports in Russia, Korea, and Japan. The ship saw little activity of note in 1904, apart from a voyage up the Yangtze in company with Fürst Bismarck up to Hankou, followed by a cruise to Singapore. By the end of the year, Hertha was in need of a more thorough overhaul than could be accomplished in the shipyards available in East Asia, prompting her return to Germany. She got underway on 31 December, passing through Mahé in the Seychelles and Dar es Salaam in German East Africa. She entered the Mediterranean on 5 April, where she met Wilhelm II, who was cruising aboard Hohenzollern. The two vessels steamed together through 8 April, when Hertha continued on to home, arriving in Kiel, where she was decommissioned on 12 May.

Later career

The boiler uptakes were altered to vent through two funnels. The work was completed by early 1908, and she was recommissioned under the command of KzS Hugo Louran on 7 April for service as a training ship for naval cadets and apprentice seamen. From 6 to 11 June, she carried Prince Ludwig to Bornholm and then to Swinemünde. She then steamed to Bremerhaven with a class of naval cadets aboard, embarking on a training cruise abroad. She visited ports in Norway, Scotland, and Ireland before steaming south to the Mediterranean Sea, stopping in Funchal, Madeira, and Las Palmas in the Canary Islands on the way. While in the Mediterranean, she made port calls in Palma de Mallorca, Alexandria, Egypt, and several cities in Italy. She stopped in Corfu on 30 December, where she met her sister . The two ships then steamed to Messina to render humanitarian assistance after an earthquake struck the area. On 1 January 1909, she embarked 120 badly injured people and evacuated them to Naples before returning to Messina the following day. Her crew went ashore and assisted with efforts to dig out people trapped in the rubble. As thanks for the ship's assistance, Queen Elena of Italy visited the ship on 5 January and King Vittorio Emanuele III issued a daily order thanking the crew. Both cruisers anchored off Corfu the next day; Hertha began the voyage back to Germany on 21 January and arrived in Kiel on 15 March.

In April, FK Walter Engelhardt relieved Louran as the ship's commander. After taking on another group of cadets, Hertha went on a short training cruise in home waters, beginning on 5 June. Hertha thereafter cruised in the Caribbean Sea, which included a stop in Kingston, Jamaica, from 9 to 11 January 1910, where she assisted the HAPAG steamship , which had run aground there. Hertha then resumed her voyage and arrived back in Kiel on 8 March.

Hertha went on another short training cruise to Norway and in the Baltic Sea in mid-1910, before departing for another extended voyage in the Mediterranean on 15 August. The cruise concluded in Kiel on 7 March 1911. In April, FK Ernst-Oldwig von Natzmer took command of the ship. A short cruise in the Baltic followed, which included a stop in Stockholm, Sweden, after which Hertha visited Norway and Scotland before returning to Wilhelmshaven, Germany. That year's long-range cruise went to the West Indies and lasted from 21 August to 11 March 1912. The annual training cruise began in early August and went to the mid-Atlantic, and included stops in the Azores and Madeira. While in Funchal, Natzmer assisted the captain of the steamer  by arresting several sailors who had been involved in a mutiny and then transferring them to another vessel that carried them back to Germany. Hertha then steamed to Barcelona, Spain, where she received orders to join the newly created Mediterranean Division on 2 November. The unit, centered on the battlecruiser , had been sent to defend German interests during the Balkan Wars. After visiting numerous ports in the region through early 1913, Hertha was detached in mid-February and arrived back in Kiel on 7 March.

After her return, she went into dry dock for periodic maintenance. In April, FK Heinrich Rohardt became the ship's captain. Hertha departed with another crew of naval cadets on 29 May for a short training cruise to Norway that concluded in Wilhelmshaven on 3 August. Twelve days later, she got underway again for the annual overseas voyage, which went to North America and the Caribbean. While there, she received orders to go to Veracruz, Mexico, to protect German interests during the Mexican Revolution; she stayed there from 21 October to 2 November. She thereafter visited the Antilles and ultimately returned to Kiel on 13 March 1914. Hertha embarked on her final peacetime training cruise on 2 June with a contingent of 75 cadets. She steamed first in the central Baltic before visiting Norway. She then crossed the North Sea to Edinburgh, Scotland, where she stayed from 22 to 25 July; the ship was the last German vessel to visit a British port before the start of World War I.

World War I
After returning to Germany in late July, Hertha had begun preparations for the annual training cruise, but these were interrupted by the outbreak of war at the end of the month. Hertha was assigned to V Scouting Group, and was initially employed on guard duty in the western Baltic in August and September. She joined her sister  and the armored cruiser  for a sweep into the eastern Baltic from 24 to 26 October; the commander of V Scouting Group, KAdm Gisberth Jasper, temporarily made Hertha is flagship for the operation. The Germans' intention was to penetrate as far as the Gulf of Finland, and while ships encountered no opposition, reports of enemy submarines led Jasper to cancel the operation while off Lyserort. On 28 October, Jasper returned to his previous flagship, Hansa. By the end of 1914, however, the ships were again removed from service, owing to their vulnerability to mine and torpedo attacks. Hertha, which had been stationed in Swinemünde, withdrew to the west on 30 October. On 16 November, she was decommissioned and thereafter converted into a barracks ship. Based in Flensburg, she supported the crews of the seaplane base there through the end of the war. Following Germany's defeat in November 1918, Hertha was stricken from the naval register on 6 December 1919 and sold to ship-breakers in Audorf-Rendsburg. and was scrapped the following year.

Notes

References

Further reading
 

Victoria Louise-class cruisers
Ships built in Stettin
1897 ships
World War I cruisers of Germany